La Prensa de Curicó (Spanish: "The Press"), is a daily newspaper published in Curicó and owned by Empresa Periodística Curicó LTDA. The headquarters is located in Sargento Aldea 632 Curicó, Chile. The newspaper was founded on November 13, 1898.

External links
La Prensa Online

Newspapers published in Chile
Publications established in 1898
Mass media in Curicó